(born January 17, 1953) is a Japanese singer-songwriter.

Life and career
Hamada was a member of the folk group Craft before pursuing a solo career.

Impact
In 2017, "Crystal Dolphin" by Engelwood sampled "Machi no Dolphin" from Hamada's 1982 midnight cruisin' album. "Crystal Dolphin" later became a popular Internet meme. The original song, Machi No Dolphin, gained widespread prominence as a result of Engelwood's sample.

Discography

Studio albums

Compilation albums

References

1953 births
J-pop singers
Japanese male composers
Living people
Musicians from Shinjuku